Sidy Sarr (born 5 June 1996) is a Senegalese professional footballer who plays as a midfielder for Chaves and the Senegal national team.

Club career
In September 2018, Sarr joined Lorient on loan from Châteauroux for the 2018–19 season.

Personal life
Sarr was taken into police custody in October 2021 on allegations that he had relations with underage prostitutes. His lawyer denied the accusations, and claimed that Sarr had been a "victim of a manipulation".

Career statistics

Club

International goals
Scores and results list Senegal's goal tally first, score column indicates score after each Sarr goal.

References

1996 births
Living people
Senegalese footballers
Association football midfielders
Senegal international footballers
2015 Africa U-23 Cup of Nations players
Belgian Pro League players
Ligue 1 players
Ligue 2 players
Championnat National 2 players
Primeira Liga players
K.V. Kortrijk players
LB Châteauroux players
FC Lorient players
Nîmes Olympique players
G.D. Chaves players
Senegalese expatriate footballers
Senegalese expatriate sportspeople in Belgium
Expatriate footballers in Belgium
Senegalese expatriate sportspeople in France
Expatriate footballers in France
Senegalese expatriate sportspeople in Portugal
Expatriate footballers in Portugal